Peter D. Lopez (born April 10, 1961) is a politician who served in the New York State Assembly from the 102nd Assembly District (established in 2012), which includes all of Schoharie County and portions of Chenango, Columbia, Delaware, Greene, Otsego, Ulster counties from 2007 to 2017. He is a Republican.

On October 1, 2017, Lopez became the regional administrator for the United States Environmental Protection Agency's region 2, based in New York City.

Early life
Lopez was born in Miami, Florida; his family moved to Schoharie, New York, where he was raised. He graduated from Schoharie Central School, the State University College at Cobleskill, and the University at Albany, where he received a Master of Public Administration degree in 1988.

Politics
Lopez became interested in public service as a young man, joining the Republican Party and running for the Schoharie Village Board at the age of 20. He lost to a candidate endorsed by the mayor. Lopez later won a seat on the Village Board and later was elected as Supervisor.

Lopez worked as staff to the New York State Legislature for 21 years, collaborating with a broad range of public and private interests at the federal, state and local levels. Among his position was as associate director of the Senate Agriculture Committee (Senator John R. Kuhl, Jr., chairman), and assistant director of the Legislative Commission on Rural Resources (Senator Charles D. Cook, chairman). He also served as the District Office Director for Assembly Minority Leader John Faso, who ran for Governor of New York in 2006, and managed constituent services, including helping seniors and veterans access benefits.

In 2004, Lopez was elected County Clerk with about 70 percent of the vote; he served until 2006.

Elected to state office
Lopez was first elected to the State Assembly in November 2006, when he defeated Siena College professor Scott Trees. He won a total of 58 percent of the vote on the Republican, Conservative, and Independence party lines.  Lopez ran uncontested in the November 2008 and November 2010 general elections. In 2012 he won from the newly defined 102nd Assembly district.

Lopez supported energy conservation and the development of alternative energy sources in the Mohawk Valley, including wind farms. In 2007 he and his staff organized a tour of the Maple Ridge, Fenner, and Madison wind farms in New York state. Lopez also supports biodiesel research and development in the state, as well as tourism, family farms, and manufacturing.

Lopez has fought against the opioid epidemic, sponsoring Laree's Law, which holds drug dealers accountable for the deaths caused by the sale of opioids and other narcotics. Lopez has also been vocal about Albany's culture of corruption, and called on fellow lawmakers to strip the pensions of Sheldon Silver and Dean Skelos, who were (in Silver's case, initially) convicted of corruption charges. Silver's conviction was overturned by the United States Court of Appeals for the Second Circuit on July 13, 2017.

Environmental Protection Agency
On September 28, 2017, Scott Pruitt, administrator of the U.S. Environmental Protection Agency, named Lopez to be regional administrator for region 2. The region 2 office is based in New York City, and its area of responsibility is New York State, New Jersey, Puerto Rico and the United States Virgin Islands.

Lopez is due to begin his position at the EPA on Oct. 1, at which point he will resign his assembly seat. New York Governor Andrew Cuomo has the responsibility to call a special election for the 102nd district.

Personal life
Lopez is a member of the SUNY Cobleskill Foundation Board as well as the Bassett Hospital Board. He is a black belt in karate.

He has been a member of an advisory committee on runaway and troubled youth, and Chairman of the Schoharie Main Street Committee. He was a founding member of Habitat for Humanity of Schoharie County.

Honors
 He received the Distinguished Alumni Award from both SUNY Cobleskill and SUNY Albany, the State University of New York's Golden Anniversary Chancellor's Recognition award, the New York State Masons' General Douglas MacArthur Award for Service to Youth, and the Schoharie County Chamber of Commerce's Leader of the Year Award.
In 2012, he received the Times Journal Star of the Year Award for his dedicated efforts in helping communities recover from the devastation of Hurricane Irene in 2011 and Tropical Storm Lee.

References

External links
 New York State Assembly Member Website

1961 births
Living people
Republican Party members of the New York State Assembly
Hispanic and Latino American state legislators in New York (state)
Politicians from Miami
People from Schoharie, New York
State University of New York at Cobleskill alumni
University at Albany, SUNY alumni
21st-century American politicians